Durbaniella is a genus of butterflies in the family Lycaenidae.The single species is endemic to the Afrotropics.

Species
Durbaniella clarki (van Son, 1941)

External links
Durbaniella at funet

Poritiinae
Lycaenidae genera